This is a list of Bollywood films that were released in 2014. PK became the highest-grossing Indian film ever at the time.

Highest-grossing films

The highest-grossing films released in 2014, by worldwide gross, are as follows:

January – March

April – June

July – September

October – December

Dubbed films

See also
 List of Bollywood films of 2015
 List of Bollywood films of 2013

Notes

References

2014
Bollywood
Bollywood